Aurélien Collin (born 8 March 1986) is a French former professional footballer who played as a defender. He spent the majority of his career playing in Major League Soccer. He is currently an assistant coach with Major League Soccer side Houston Dynamo.

Playing career

Europe
Collin began his career in the youth ranks of French side Sedan in 2004 and remained with the club until joining Amiens one year later. In 2007, he left for Spain joining the youth ranks of Mallorca.

Collin joined Scottish club Gretna from La Liga club Mallorca in August 2007, receiving international clearance to play for the club on 14 August. He signed a two-year contract with the club. He made his debut for the club in a 1–1 draw with Hearts on 18 August. He scored an own goal in a 4–0 defeat against Rangers on 1 September 2007 at Ibrox Stadium.

Following his release by Gretna, Collin spent a week on trial with English Championship club Blackpool, having also been on trial with fellow Championship clubs, Preston North End, and later, Wolverhampton Wanderers. However, none of these trials led to a permanent deal being offered. He later signed a one-year contract with Greek club Panserraikos.

On 5 February 2009, Collin joined Conference club Wrexham on a one-year contract until the end of the season, making his debut in a 0–0 draw with Ebbsfleet United. On 5 August 2009, he joined Portuguese side Vitoria Setubal on a free transfer and a two-year deal. He scored his first goal with Vitoria on 16 January 2010 in a 2–2 draw with Vitória Guimarães. While with the Portuguese side, Collin appeared in 37  matches and scored five goals.

United States

On 15 April 2011, Collin signed a contract with Sporting Kansas City of Major League Soccer. In his first season in Kansas City, Collin established himself as a starter playing alongside Matt Besler. The following season, he helped Kansas City in capturing the 2012 Lamar Hunt U.S. Open Cup. On 7 December 2013, Collin scored the game tying goal in the 2013 Major League Soccer Cup Final, rifling home a header from a Graham Zusi corner kick against Real Salt Lake. He was awarded the 2013 MLS Cup MVP as Sporting Kansas City won the match on penalties to claim the title, following his equalizer by converting the decisive spot kick in the tenth round. During the club's title run Collin appeared in 5 matches and scored three goals.

On 8 December 2014, Collin was traded from Sporting Kansas City to new expansion side Orlando City SC for allocation money and defender Jalil Anibaba. Collin got himself sent off for a challenge made on David Villa on his debut against New York City FC. In his first season with the club, he appeared in 28 league matches scoring two goals.

On 29 April 2016 Collin was acquired from Orlando by New York Red Bulls. On 6 May 2016 he made his debut for the club in a 1–1 draw against his former club Orlando City SC. In mid May he helped his new side to consecutive shut out victories, including a 7-0 Hudson River derby victory against New York City FC on 21 May 2016.

Collin was released by the Red Bulls at the end of their 2018 season. On 22 January 2019, it was announced that Collin had joined the Philadelphia Union. Collin's contract with Philadelphia expired following their 2020 season. However, he re-signed for the club ahead of the 2021 season. Following the 2021 season, Collin's contract option was declined by Philadelphia. On 24 March 2022, Collin announced his retirement from football.

Coaching career
On 5 January 2023, Collin was announced as an assistant coach for Major League Soccer side Houston Dynamo, working with head coach Ben Olsen.

Personal life

While playing for Sporting Kansas City, Collin started studying for an online degree in fashion design. "Since I was young I was into fashion and following the best designers and going to fashion shows," he explained. "I read the magazines about fashion every day. I love it. It's one of my passions. I have a lot of projects in my mind. A lot of things I began here. But I need to study first to be the best so I can really begin my projects." Collin was a fan favorite at Sporting Kansas City, giving away his game-worn jersey to a fan after every home game.

Career statistics

Honours
Sporting Kansas City
MLS Cup: 2013
U.S. Open Cup: 2012

New York Red Bulls
Supporters' Shield: 2018

Philadelphia Union
Supporters' Shield: 2020
Individual
MLS Best XI: 2012
MLS Cup MVP: 2013

References

External links
 
 
 
 
 

1986 births
Living people
People from Enghien-les-Bains
Association football defenders
French footballers
French expatriate footballers
Gretna F.C. players
Panserraikos F.C. players
Wrexham A.F.C. players
Vitória F.C. players
Sporting Kansas City players
Orlando City SC players
New York Red Bulls players
Scottish Premier League players
Super League Greece players
Primeira Liga players
Expatriate footballers in Scotland
Expatriate footballers in Spain
Expatriate footballers in Greece
Expatriate footballers in Portugal
Expatriate soccer players in the United States
National League (English football) players
Major League Soccer players
Major League Soccer All-Stars
French expatriate sportspeople in the United States
Footballers from Val-d'Oise
Philadelphia Union players
Houston Dynamo FC non-playing staff